The 2017 Strade Bianche was a road cycling one-day race that took place on 4 March. It was the eleventh edition of the Strade Bianche and was the fifth event of the 2017 UCI World Tour. It was the first time that the race was included in the UCI World Tour calendar.

Poland's Michał Kwiatkowski became the second rider, after Fabian Cancellara, to win multiple editions of the race, after attacking from a group of four race favourites with around  remaining and was able to solo away to the race victory. Second place was taken by Greg Van Avermaet for the  fifteen seconds in arrears, while a further two seconds back in third place, 's Tim Wellens completed the podium.

Teams
As a new event to the UCI World Tour, all UCI WorldTeams were invited to the race, but not obligated to compete in the race. However, all eighteen UCI WorldTeams elected to compete in the race, the first such occurrence in relation to the new-for-2017 races. Three UCI Professional Continental teams competed, completing the 21-team peloton.

Route
 
The race started and finished in the UNESCO World Heritage Site of Siena, for the second successive year, prior to which the race started in San Gimignano. The Strade Bianche is particularly renowned for its sectors of strade bianche or sterrati, which comprise large sections of the route.

The two returning sectors come within the first , at Bagnaia and Radi. The first sector was addressed just  after the start; the longest and most arduous sectors were the ones in Lucignano d'Asso,  in length, and the -long Monte Sante Marie.

The latter section was renamed in honour of Fabian Cancellara, following his third win in the race in 2016. The last stretch of gravel road came  from the finish in Siena. The race finished on Siena's illustrious Piazza del Campo, after a narrow ascent on the roughly-paved Via Santa Caterina in the heart of the medieval city, with steep stretches of up to 16% in gradient.

Result

References

External links
 

Strade Bianche
Strade Bianche
Strade Bianche
March 2017 sports events in Italy